Eben Alexander III (born December 11, 1953) is an American neurosurgeon and author. His book Proof of Heaven: A Neurosurgeon's Journey into the Afterlife (2012) describes his near-death experience that happened in 2008 under medically-induced coma when treated for meningitis. He asserts that the coma resulted in brain death, that consciousness is not only a product of the brain and that this permits access to an afterlife. Alexander has also authored follow-up books.

Early life and education
Alexander was born in Charlotte, North Carolina. He was adopted by Eben Alexander Jr and his wife Elizabeth West Alexander and raised in Winston-Salem, North Carolina, with three siblings. He attended Phillips Exeter Academy, University of North Carolina at Chapel Hill (A.B., 1975), and the Duke University School of Medicine (M.D., 1980).

Medical career
Alexander has taught and had appointments at Duke University Medical Center, Brigham and Women's Hospital, University of Massachusetts Medical School, University of Virginia School of Medicine, Boston Children's Hospital, Dana–Farber Cancer Institute et al.

While practicing medicine in Lynchburg at the Lynchburg General Hospital, Alexander was reprimanded by the Virginia Board of Medicine for performing surgery at an incorrect surgical site, two times over the course of a month. In one instance, Alexander altered his operative report because he believed the surgery had diminished the patient's symptoms. He was sued by the patient for damages totaling $3 million in August 2008, but the case was dismissed by the plaintiff in 2009. As a result of the mishaps, Alexander lost his privileges at the hospital and was forced to pay a $3,500 fine to the Virginia Board of Medicine and complete ethics and professionalism training to maintain an unrestricted medical license in the state.

Following the release of his 2012 book Proof of Heaven, Esquire magazine reported that Alexander had been terminated or suspended from multiple hospital positions, and had been the subject of several malpractice lawsuits and that he settled five malpractice suits in Virginia within a period of ten years.

Writing career

Proof of Heaven

Alexander authored Proof of Heaven: A Neurosurgeon's Journey into the Afterlife in 2012. The book expounds on his near-death experience while suffering from a bacterial meningitis and under a medically induced coma. Alexander describes how the experience changed his perceptions of life and the afterlife. The book was a commercial success but also was the subject of scientific criticism in relation to misconceptions about neurology, such as conflating medically induced coma with brain death. A 2013 article in Esquire magazine refuted many of the claims made in the book. The doctor who treated Alexander stated that certain details can not be true, such as claims Alexander made about speaking clearly at times he would have been intubated.

Alexander presented related lectures around the world in churches, hospitals, medical schools, and academic symposia, besides appearing on TV shows including Super Soul Sunday with Oprah Winfrey. Alexander has also expanded on his NDE in the Congress of Neurological Surgeons and the peer-reviewed Journal of the Missouri State Medical Association.
Proof of Heaven was included on The New York Times Best Seller list for 97 weeks.

The Map of Heaven 
Alexander's second book, The Map of Heaven: How Science, Religion, and Ordinary People Are Proving the Afterlife, was published in October 2014, where he again asserted the existence of an afterlife and that consciousness is independent of the brain. Alexander framed his observations with quotations from spiritual teachers and paired them with the recent work of scientists with the aim of bridging religion and science. He cross-referenced spiritual experiences from readers and different religions to build his case on what heaven looked like.  The Map of Heaven was number 12 on the New York Times bestseller list during the week ending November 2, 2014.

Living in a Mindful Universe
Alexander's third book, Living in a Mindful Universe: A Neurosurgeon's Journey into the Heart of Consciousness, was coauthored with Karen Newell, cofounder of Sacred Acoustics and published in 2017.

Personal life
In 2000, Alexander located his birth parents but learned his birth mother did not want to meet him. His birth mother eventually changed her mind and Alexander met his birth parents and siblings in 2007.

References

External links
 

1953 births
20th-century American physicians
21st-century American physicians
21st-century American non-fiction writers
American male non-fiction writers
American neurosurgeons
Angelic visionaries
Duke University School of Medicine alumni
Harvard Medical School faculty
Living people
Nautilus Book Award winners
Near-death experiences
Phillips Exeter Academy alumni
Physicians from North Carolina
Quantum mysticism advocates
University of North Carolina at Chapel Hill alumni
Writers from Charlotte, North Carolina
Near-death experience researchers
21st-century American male writers